was a Japanese actress, voice actress and singer. She was the only child of actor Masaki Kanda and pop singer Seiko Matsuda.

Early life
Kanda was born at Tokyo Teishin Hospital in Chiyoda, Tokyo. She was the only child of actor Masaki Kanda and Seiko Matsuda. Her paternal grandmother Teruko Asahi (1924–2001) was a former actress.

Career
In 1999, while a student at a Japanese school in Los Angeles, she appeared in Bean Cake, a short film that won the Palme d'Or du court métrage at the 2001 Cannes Film Festival. She was quite active as an actress in movies and mostly on stage since her debut. She also wrote some lyrics for her mother Seiko Matsuda's songs.

Kanda made her Kōhaku Uta Gassen debut in December 2011 singing "Ue o Muite Arukō" alongside her mother, Seiko Matsuda.

In July 2012, Kanda debuted as a voice actress on TV animation Good Luck Girl!, which led her to be cast as Anna in the Japanese language dub of Disney's animated film Frozen. She won the Best Lead Actress award for the role in the 9th Seiyu Awards. In 2019, she voiced as Anna once again for Kingdom Hearts III.

In April 2014, she formed the duo Trustrick with guitarist Billy. They released their debut album, Eternity, on June 25 of the same year. They disbanded on 17 December 2016.

Kanda appeared as a special guest in the Alan Symphony Concert from December 20, 2014 alongside Tibetan Chinese diva Alan Dawa Dolma, and together, they sang a music piece originally performed by Alan titled .

Kanda released covers of Vocaloid songs on her YouTube channel.

Personal life
In May 2017, Kanda married actor Mitsu Murata. Kanda announced their divorce in December 2019. Up until her death, Kanda was in a relationship with actor Takahisa Maeyama after co-starring in the stage adaptation of Crest of the Royal Family in August 2021. Kanda and Maeyama had planned to marry.

Death
On December 18, 2021, Kanda was found unconscious in the outer garden on the fourteenth floor of a hotel in Chūō ward, Sapporo. She was later pronounced dead at a hospital. The cause of death was determined to be traumatic shock by the Sapporo Central Police Station, which also said that she had fallen from her room in the upper floors of the hotel. Kanda's remains were cremated and her family kept her ashes at home. A report from Shūkan Bunshun claimed she committed suicide following vocal cord issues as well as issues with her relationship with Maeyama.

Discography

Singles
 "Ever Since" (2002)
 "Garden" (2003)
 "Mizu Iro" (2004)
 "Jōgen no Tsuki" (2005)

with TRUSTRICK
 "World's End Curtain Call -theme of DANGANRONPA THE STAGE-" (2014)
 "FLYING FAFNIR" (2015)
 "innocent promise" (2015)
 "Recall THE END" (2016)
 "DEAD OR LIE" (2016) duo with Maon Kurosaki
 "Rainbow Summer" (2019), the theme song of Atelier Ryza: Ever Darkness & the Secret Hideout

Digital Singles
 "LUVORATORRRRRY!" (2018)
 "Good Morning, Polar Night" (2019)
 "Roki" (2019)
with TRUSTRICK
 "On your marks!" (2014)
as Yuna from "Sword Art Online"
 "Ubiquitous dB" (2017)
 "delete" (2017)
 "Break Beat Bark!" (2017)
 "longing" (2017)
 "smile for you" (2017)

Albums
 Doll (2005)
 Liberty (2011)

with TRUSTRICK
 Eternity (2014)
 TRUST (2015)
 TRICK (2016)

Mini-Albums
with TRUSTRICK
未来系Answer E.P. (2015)
beloved E.P. (2016)

Cover Albums
MUSICALOID #38 (2018)
MUSICALOID #38 Act.2 (2019)
MUSICALOID #38 Act.3 (2021)

Compilation Albums
as Yuna from "Sword Art Online"
Sword Art Online the Movie : Ordinal Scale (Original Motion Picture Soundtrack) (2017)

Filmography

Film
 Bean Cake (1999)
 Dragon Head (2003) – Ako Seto
 School Wars: Hero (2004) – Mitiyo Wada
 Imadoki Japanese yo (2008) – Kyouko
 Farewell, Kamen Rider Den-O: Final Countdown (2008) – Sora
 Amazing Grace (2011) – Shizuku Asamizu
 Geki×Cine Bara to Samurai (2011) – Pony de Bribon
 Real Girl (2018) – Ezomichi (voice)

Television drama
 Yankee Bokō ni Kaeru / Drop-out Teacher Returns to School (TBS, 2003) – Nanae Koga
 四分の一の絆 (TBS, 2004)  – Maiko Nisio
 Mito Kōmon (TBS, 2004, 2007) – Kozue, Osaki
 たった一度の雪 〜SAPPORO・1972年〜 (HBC, 2007)  – Chiho Shimomura
 Omotesando Koukou Gasshoubu! (TBS, 2015) – Emiri Seyama

Theater Performances
 Into the Woods (2004) – Little Red Ridinghood (credited as SAYAKA)
 Murasaki Shikibu Story (2006, 2008) – Empress Shōshi
 The Woman in White (2007) – Laura Fairlie
 A Midsummer Night's Dream (2007-2009) – Peaseblossom
 A Midsummer Night's Dream (2008) – Hermia
 Love Letters (2008–2010) – Melissa
 Grease (2008) – Sandy
 She Loves Me (2009–2010) – Amalia Balash
 Bara to Samurai〜Goemon Rock OverDrive (2010) – Pony de Bribon
 Les Miserables (2009–2011) – Cosette
 Peter Pan (2009–2011, 2017) – Wendy Darling
 The Fantasticks (2010) – Luisa
 Endless SHOCK (2012) – Rika
 Anne of Green Gables (2012) – Anne Shirley
 Himeyuri (2012–2014) – Kimi
 Dance of the Vampires (2015–2020) – Sarah
 Danganronpa The Stage (2014–2016) – Mukuro Ikusaba and Junko Enoshima
 Super Danganronpa 2 The Stage (2015–2017) – Junko Enoshima
 1789: Les Amants de la Bastille (2016–2018) – Olympe
 Legally Blonde (2017–2019) – Elle Woods
 Fiddler on the Roof (2017) – Hodel
 My Fair Lady (2018-2021) – Eliza Doolittle
 SHOW BOY (2019)
 Rose's Dilemma (2021) – Arlene
 Crest of the Royal Family (2021) – Carol Reed

Japanese dub
 Frozen (2013) – Anna
 Ralph Breaks the Internet (2018) – Anna
 Frozen II (2019) – Anna

Theatrical animation
 GAMBA (2015) – Shioji
 Sword Art Online The Movie: Ordinal Scale (2017) – Yuna
 Space Battleship Yamato 2202: Warriors of Love (2017)

Television animation
 Good Luck Girl! (2012) – Nadeshiko Adenokouji
 Unlimited Fafnir (2015) – Miyako Shinomiya
 Convenience Store Boy Friends (2017) – Miharu Mashiki
 Real Girl (2018) – Ezomichi
 Sword Art Online: Alicization - War of Underworld (2020) – Yuna
 Idoly Pride (2021) – Mana Nagase

Video games
 Danganronpa V3: Killing Harmony (2017) – Kaede Akamatsu
 Let It Die (2017) – Kiwako Seto
 Kingdom Hearts III (2019) – Anna
 Accel World vs. Sword Art Online: Millennium Twilight (2017) - Yuna
 Sword Art Online: Fatal Bullet (2018) - Yuna

References

External links 
 Official website 
 
 

1986 births
2021 deaths
2021 suicides
20th-century Japanese actresses
21st-century Japanese actresses
21st-century Japanese women singers
21st-century Japanese singers
Deaths from falls
Japanese YouTubers
Japanese film actresses
Japanese idols
Japanese television actresses
Japanese television personalities
Japanese video game actresses
Japanese voice actresses
Japanese women pop singers
Musicians from Setagaya
Music YouTubers
Singers from Tokyo
Sony Music Entertainment Japan artists
Voice actresses from Setagaya
Voice actresses from Tokyo Metropolis
Suicides by jumping in Japan
Female suicides